Sporting Club de Bangui is a football (soccer) club from the Central African Republic based in Bangui.

The team plays in the Central African Republic League.

Stadium
Currently the team plays at the 35000 capacity Barthelemy Boganda Stadium.

Performance in CAF competitions
1979 African Cup Winners' Cup
1981 African Cup of Champions Clubs
1993 African Cup of Champions Clubs
1998 African Cup Winners' Cup

Current players
 styven biamba
 Ange Oueifio
 Lawrence Adjei

References

External links
Footballzz

Football clubs in the Central African Republic
Bangui